Antona peruviana is a moth of the subfamily Arctiinae first described by Schaus in 1892. It is found in Peru.

References

Lithosiini
Moths described in 1892
Moths of South America